Alan Sked  (born 22 August 1947) is a British eurosceptic academic notable for having founded the Anti-Federalist League (in order to oppose the Maastricht Treaty) and its successor the UK Independence Party (Ukip). He is Professor Emeritus of International History at the London School of Economics and has stood as a candidate in several parliamentary elections.

Early life
Sked was educated at Allan Glen's School in Glasgow, before going on to study Modern and Medieval History at the University of Glasgow, followed by a DPhil in Politics at Merton College, Oxford.

Academic career
Sked's doctoral supervisor at Oxford was A. J. P. Taylor, who was a major influence on him. In particular, Sked's writings on the Habsburg monarchy owe much to Taylor, although their interpretations are very different. He has also written texts on British political and European history. His books have been translated into German, Italian, Czech, Portuguese, Japanese and Chinese.

At the London School of Economics (LSE) he taught courses on US and modern intellectual history, and on the history of sex, race and slavery. He retired in 2015, and as of January 2018 is an Emeritus Professor in the LSE's Department of International History. Sked is a member of the British-American Project, which exists to promote Britain's political ties to the US.

Political career
In the 1970 general election he stood at Paisley as a candidate for the Liberal Party (which later combined with the SDP to form the Liberal Democrats), but later rejected the party's support because it favoured movement toward a European Union (EU). He served for ten years (1980–1990) as Convenor of European Studies, a postgraduate MA programme at LSE, where he examined many theses on European history and served as joint chairman of LSE's European Research Seminar. He came to believe that the EC was corrupt and anti-democratic, and a liability to the British economy. He was a founding member of the Bruges Group and remained a member until 1991, when he was expelled by its executive committee. This was because in November 1991 he had founded the Anti-Federalist League (AFL), an anti-EC political party that ran candidates, including Sked, in the 1992 general election, when he contested Bath.

In 1993, Sked stood in two parliamentary by-elections: one at Newbury, where he shared a platform with Enoch Powell, who spoke in his support, and a second, soon afterward, at Christchurch. On both occasions he came fourth, behind the major parties (there were 19 candidates at Newbury and 14 at Christchurch). Encouraged by these results, the AFL changed its name that September to the UK Independence Party (UKIP). Sked, however, resigned the leadership shortly after the 1997 general election, citing party factionalism and the growing influence of radical, far-right opinion in the party's ranks, saying that it was "doomed to remain on the political fringes". He also opposed its plan to take up places in the European Parliament if seats should be won there, wanting all party efforts to be concentrated on the UK Parliament.

Shortly before each subsequent national election (European Parliament, 1999, Westminster, 2001 and European Parliament, 2004), he published articles accusing UKIP of extremism and incompetence. A few days before the 2004 election to the European Parliament, in which UKIP increased its representation from three to twelve seats, he criticised his former party in a national newspaper, saying, "They are racist and have been infected by the far-right." He went on record saying, "UKIP is even less liberal than the British National Party (BNP). Certainly, there is a symbiosis between elements of the parties," and, "UKIP's MEPs are a standing joke at Strasbourg, where their attendance record, even by the standards of most MEPs, is relatively poor and where, according to independent research by the European Studies centre at the London School of Economics, the three often vote in different ways on the same issue."

In 2003, just before the Iraq War, he wrote that opposition to the militaristic foreign policy of George W. Bush within Europe was not born of principle, but rather stemmed "largely from jealousy of the United States" and a purported knowledge that European countries, united or otherwise, "have no military, diplomatic, moral or economic resources with which to challenge the United States".

In September 2013, he founded New Deal, a political party described as "a new left-of-centre, anti-EU party which he hopes will challenge Labour", and appeared on the BBC TV Daily Politics show to discuss it. New Deal was de-registered in 2015, having never fielded a single candidate in any election.

After the 2014 European Parliament elections
Following the 2014 European elections, he further criticised UKIP as "Frankenstein's monster" and said that he intended to stand against the Labour leader Ed Miliband in the 2015 general election. He also described his former UKIP colleague Nigel Farage as a "dim-witted racist".

In an article dated 21 October 2015 for The National Interest, Sked wrote the following regarding Nigel Farage and the state of UKIP under his leadership,

"After I stepped down to return to academic life, however, the party came under control of a preposterous mountebank named Nigel Farage, who reoriented it to the far right. The clause about a lack of prejudices was abolished and all sorts of nasty statements were made against blacks, Muslims and gays. Former members of the National Front were allowed to work for the party or become candidates. The party itself has deliquesced into a cult around Farage, whose electoral failure in 2015 has made him an object of scorn in the media and prompted his financial backers to desert him. Farage has become a convenient figure with which to frighten moderate voters about the consequences of fulfilling my party’s original mission—withdrawal from the European Union."

Prosper UK
Sked announced in early December 2018 the founding of another political party, Prosper UK. The party split from UKIP following Tommy Robinson's admission as a special advisor to UKIP's then leader Gerard Batten, as a eurosceptic alternative in response to perceived radical elements growing within the party. Prosper UK was de-registered (removed) from the Register of Political Parties in August 2020.

All for Unity
In 2021, he was announced as a candidate for All for Unity, a new party led by George Galloway to contest the 2021 Scottish Parliament election.

Elections contested
UK Parliament elections

Partial bibliography
 Sked, A. & Cook, C. (eds.) (1976) Crisis and Controversy: Essays in Honour of A.J.P. Taylor. (London: Macmillan) .
 Sked, A. & Cook, C. (1979) Post-war Britain: A Political History
 Sked, A. (1979) The Survival of the Habsburg Empire: Radetzky, the Imperial Army and the Class War, 1848. (London: Longmans) .
 Sked, A. (1987) Britain's Decline: Problems and Perspectives. (Oxford: Basil Blackwell) .
 Sked, A. & Cook, C. (1993) Post-war Britain: a Political History (1945–1992). (4th ed.) (Harmondsworth: Penguin) .
 Sked, A. (2001) The Decline and Fall of the Habsburg Empire, 1815–1918. (2nd ed.) (London: Longman) .
 Sked, A. (2007), Metternich and Austria: An Evaluation. (London: Palgrave MacMillan) 
 Sked, A. (2011) Radetzky: Imperial Victor and Military Genius. (London: I.B. Tauris)
 Sked, A. (2020) A Critical History of Scotland from Independence to the Present in 14 articles. (Think Scotland, Edinburgh)

References

Sources

External links
 Alan Sked page on the LSE website

1947 births
Academics of the London School of Economics
Alumni of Merton College, Oxford
Alumni of the University of Glasgow
Fellows of the Royal Historical Society
Leaders of the UK Independence Party
Liberal Party (UK) politicians
Living people
British political party founders
British Eurosceptics